The International Association for Analytical Psychology (IAAP) is the international accrediting and regulatory body for all Jungian societies and groups of analytical psychology practitioners, trainees, and affiliates. Analytical psychology was founded by Carl Gustav Jung.

The Association is based in Zurich and was founded in 1955 by C.G. Jung and a group of international analysts. It has member associations/affiliates in 58 countries.

Objectives
The main objectives of the IAAP are to advance the understanding and utility of analytical psychology worldwide, and to ensure that the highest professional, scientific and ethical standards are maintained in the training and practice of analytical psychologists among its Member Groups.

See also
 Society of Analytical Psychology
 British Jungian Analytic Association

References

External links
 
 International Association for Jungian Studies

Analytical psychology
International medical and health organizations
International organizations based in the United States
Organizations established in 1955
Carl Jung
1955 establishments in Switzerland